UK Trade & Investment (UKTI) was a UK Government department working with businesses based in the United Kingdom to assist their success in international markets, and with overseas investors looking to the UK as an investment destination. It was replaced in July 2016 by the Department for International Trade.

History

UKTI was formed in May 1999 as British Trade International, comprising two parts: Trade Partners UK (for export promotion) and Invest UK (for inward investment - FDI). In October 2003, the former department name and two inner departments merged and became UK Trade & Investment to simplify the outward recognition of the organisation, and possibly to reduce confusion with the two departments.

Aims
To support its aim to "enhance the competitiveness of companies in Britain through overseas trade and investments; and attract a continuing high level of quality foreign direct investment".

Structure
UK Trade & Investment is an international organisation with headquarters in London and Glasgow in Scotland. Across its network UK Trade & Investment employs around 2,400 staff and advisers, including overseas in British Embassies, High Commissions, Consulates and trade offices, and regional offices in the nine English regions. 

The delivery of many UKTI regional services within the United Kingdom is contracted out to other organisations. In Devon, Cornwall and Somerset, UKTI regional services are now delivered by Serco, In China, the China Britain Business Council, another private body, is the provider.

Business and university leaders work with UKTI as "business ambassadors". They promote the UK internationally and highlight trade and investment opportunities. They focus on helping small and medium-sized enterprises (SMEs).

UK Trade & Investment brings together the work of the Foreign & Commonwealth Office and the Department for Business, Energy and Industrial Strategy.  The UK Special Representative for International Trade and Investment works as part of UKTI to promote British business and produce.

UK Trade & Investment has public-private partnership agreements with the Federation of International Trade Associations under which they contribute market research and other reports on GlobalTrade.net. 
 
UK Trade & Investment has an arms-trade branch called UKTI DSO (UK Trade & Investment Defence & Security Organisation) headed by Sir Richard Paniguian.

References

External links

Economic history of the United Kingdom
Organizations established in 1999
Investment promotion agencies
Department for Business, Innovation and Skills
Foreign, Commonwealth and Development Office
Foreign trade of the United Kingdom
Business organisations based in the United Kingdom
1999 establishments in the United Kingdom
Investment in the United Kingdom
Trade in the United Kingdom
2003 establishments in the United Kingdom
Defunct departments of the Government of the United Kingdom